Jordan Nikemian Akins (born April 19, 1992) is an American football tight end for the Cleveland Browns of the National Football League. He played college football at UCF.

Early years
Akins graduated from Union Grove High School in McDonough, Georgia. He earned All-State honors as both a junior and senior, as well as All-Conference as a sophomore. He committed and signed to play football for the UCF Knights, choosing the Knights over schools such as LSU and Georgia. However, after being drafted by the Texas Rangers in the third round of the 2010 MLB Draft, he chose to pursue a baseball career instead of attending UCF and signed with the Rangers. Akins struggled in the minor leagues, hitting .218 over four seasons and never rising above high-A ball. He retired from baseball after the 2013 season and returned to play football at UCF.

College career
As a true freshman in 2014, Akins played in all 13 of UCF's games, catching 12 passes for 135 yards along with returning 15 kickoffs for 363 yards.

Akins started the 2015 as a starter, but suffered a season-ending injury in UCF's third game against Furman. He elected to take a medical redshirt.

As a redshirt sophomore in 2016, Akins once again played in all 13 of UCF's games, tallying 23 receptions for 347 yards and two touchdowns.

Prior to the 2017 season, Akins was named to the John Mackey Award watch list. He played in 12 of UCF's 13 games, catching 32 passes for 515 yards and four touchdowns. After the season, Akins declared for the 2018 NFL Draft.

Collegiate statistics

Professional career
On January 3, 2018, Akins announced his decision to forgo his remaining eligibility and enter the 2018 NFL Draft. On January 13, 2018, it was announced that Akins had accepted an invitation to play in the 2018 Senior Bowl. On January 27, 2018, Akins played in the 2018 Reese's Senior Bowl and caught two passes for 31 yards as part of Houston Texans head coach Bill O'Brien's South team that defeated Denver Broncos head coach Vance Joseph's North team 45–16. Akins sustained a hamstring injury ten days before the NFL Scouting Combine in Indianapolis and was unable to perform any drills and chose to skip the bench press. He attended private workouts and meetings with the Detroit Lions, Kansas City Chiefs, Los Angeles Chargers, and New Orleans Saints. At the conclusion of the pre-draft process, Akins was projected to be a sixth round pick or priority undrafted free agent by NFL draft experts and scouts. He was ranked as the eighth best tight end prospect in the draft by Scouts Inc. and was ranked the 16th best tight end by DraftScout.com.

Houston Texans
The Houston Texans selected Akins in the third round (98th overall) of the 2018 NFL Draft. Akins was the fifth tight end drafted in 2018. He became the highest drafted tight end in UCF's history.

2018
On May 10, 2018, the Houston Texans signed Akins to a four-year, $3.32 million contract that includes a signing bonus of $761,520. In the season opener against the New England Patriots, Akins had two receptions for 11 yards in his NFL debut. He played in 16 games with six starts, recording 17 receptions for 225 yards.

2019
In Week 3 against the Los Angeles Chargers, Akins caught three passes for 73 yards and two touchdowns in the 27–20 win. Overall, Akins finished the 2019 season with 36 receptions for 418 receiving yards and two receiving touchdowns.

2020
In Week 1 against the Kansas City Chiefs, Akins recorded two receptions for 39 yards and a touchdown in the 34–20 loss.

New York Giants
On April 22, 2022, the New York Giants signed Akins to a one-year contract. On August 24, 2022, Akins was released.

Houston Texans (second stint)
On August 31, 2022, Akins was signed to the Houston Texans practice squad. He was promoted to the active roster on October 12.

NFL career statistics

Regular season

Postseason

References

External links
 Houston Texans bio
 UCF Knights bio

1992 births
Living people
African-American baseball players
American football tight ends
Arizona League Rangers players
Baseball outfielders
Players of American football from Atlanta
Hickory Crawdads players
Houston Texans players
Minor league baseball players
Players of American football from Georgia (U.S. state)
Spokane Indians players
UCF Knights football players
21st-century African-American sportspeople